Lopar  may refer to:

 Lopar (Fojnica), a village in Bosnia and Herzegovina
 Lopar, Croatia, a village on the island of Rab
 Lopar, Koper, a village in Slovenia

See also

Lotar (disambiguation)